Oshikango railway station is a terminal railway station on the Namibian-Angolan border serving the village of Oshikango and the town of Helao Nafidi. It is part of the TransNamib Railway railway network. The railway station was inaugurated on 5 July 2012 by the Namibian president Hifikepunye Pohamba.

History

Trains

Nearest Airport
The nearest airports are Ondangwa Airport at Ondangwa, Otjiwarongo Airport at Otjiwarongo.

See also

References

External links

Railway stations in Namibia
TransNamib Railway
Buildings and structures in Ohangwena Region
2012 establishments in Namibia
Railway stations opened in 2012